Minor Basilica of St. Anne (Malay: Basilika Minor St. Anne, Tamil: புனித அன்னமாள் தேவாலயம், Punitha annamaal Tēvālayam), is a Roman Catholic church located in Bukit Mertajam, Penang, Malaysia. It is one of the parishes in the Diocese of Penang. Its annual celebration of the feast of St Anne regularly attracts over 100,000 pilgrims from Malaysia as well as neighbouring countries like Singapore, Thailand, Vietnam, Indonesia, the Philippines and Australia. The celebration lasts for 10 days, and includes the actual feast day on 26 July.

History

The origins of St. Anne's Sanctuary can be traced back to as far back as 1833, when Chinese and Indian migrant workers arrived from the Batu Kawan area in Penang. In 1840, Chinese Catholics settled at the foothills of Bukit Mertajam and worked in the farms and orchards. At that time, there was already an established parish in Batu Kawan. Thus, French missionaries from Batu Kawan came to Bukit Mertajam to minister to the Catholic families in the area.

The Catholics in Bukit Mertajam then numbered about 190. Fr. Adolphe Couellan, MEP was the first visiting priest, and it was not long later that he saw the need for a chapel. Consequently, he built one on top of the hill, about two kilometres from the town of Bukit Mertajam. The foundation and cornerstone of this first chapel can still be seen at its original site at St. Anne's Hill today.

The earliest records of the parish were that of baptisms in 1846, making it the year the parish was officially established. Consequently, from 1860 onwards, visiting priests came from Permatang Tinggi. With the increase in the Catholic population, a bigger chapel was built in 1865 by Fr. Maistre MEP. The foundation stones of this second chapel can be found behind St. Anne's Water Fount.

Four years later, Fr. Allard MEP was assigned to the parish and became its first resident parish priest. In 1883, Fr. F. P. Sorin MEP took over the parish and served for 15 years. It was Fr. Sorin who built a bigger church in 1888 for the locals as the Catholic population increased. Today, this same church still stands and has become the revered Shrine of Harmony. It was also fondly called the “Old Church” by local parishioners. Incidentally, Fr. Sorin died on the feast of St. Anne, 26 July 1907 and he was buried in the main aisle of the church that he built.

Soon after the Japanese occupation, the threat of Communism loomed over Malaysia. In 1948, the British Government to declare a State of Emergency, the church grounds were designated as a no-go area. Curfew was imposed and there was food rationing as well. Many restrictions were imposed on the local population. Bukit Mertajam Hill was often bombarded by the army as communist terrorists were believed to be hiding there.

Generally, many Chinese were suspected to be communist sympathisers by the British Government and they were uprooted from their lands and houses and relocated to the infamous Chinese New Villages throughout the country. Around Bukit Mertajam, we can still find them in Berapit, Machang Bubuk, Sungai Lembu and Junjung. Eventually, the church grounds (old church) were declared out of bounds and labelled as a "black area" because of the communist insurgency. Thus, church services were temporarily held in the chapel of the Holy Infant Jesus Convent instead of the church. It was only in 1960 that the emergency was lifted. In 1977, the church started moving back to the St. Anne's Shrine and restoration works begin, due to being abandoned for a long time. The stained glass inside and one of the three bells were recovered.

It was at this time that the parish priest, Fr. Thomas Chin, saw the need to build a new church for worship because of the communist insurgency. Thus, in 1957, the land which was bought by Fr. Teng became the site of the church (fondly called the "new" church) which had a capacity of about seven hundred seats. It took about 2 years to complete and this church was used by the parish for the next 46 years, until July 2002 when the parish moved back to the Sanctuary grounds. This church was known as the "new church" for over 40 years, and was the main centre for the parish and the feast celebrations until 2002. In these years of the feast, pilgrims had to commute between this church and St. Anne's Shrine, which is 2 km away. This grounds now occupies the Kim Sen Primary School.

The 1990s to 2000s saw a major transformation for this church. Fr. Michael Cheah built the present church. The construction began at the end of 1998 and was completed in the middle of 2002. This church could fit 2,200 people, and is one of the largest churches in Malaysia. It was opened by the then Apostolic Delegate to Malaysia on 26 July 2002. This church has Minangkabau roofs, truly reflecting the Malaysian culture. Not only was a new church constructed, an avenue named Dataran St. Anne was constructed in front of the church. In view of turning St. Anne's Church into a pilgrim centre, Domus St Anne was also built to accommodate pilgrims who intend to stay over. A parish office, parish community centre and presbytery were also built, thus enlarging the sanctuary grounds.

In 2006, the church installed 'Statues of Passion' at a cost of RM600,000. These statues depict the stations of the cross. A grotto dedicated in honour of the Blessed Virgin Mary was opened on 26 July 2008. In June 2010, a second accommodation place, St. Anne's Dorm, was opened by the then parish priest Fr Stephen Liew. Currently, the parish priest is Bishop Sebastian Francis, with Msgr Henry Rajoo and Fr Leo Elias as assistant parish priests.  At present, St. Anne's Church also administers 2 chapels, namely Chapel of Our Lady of Sorrows in Alma, and Chapel of Our Lady of Fatima in Berapit.

In 2019, it was granted the title of 'Minor Basilica' by the Pope through the Congregation for Divine Worship and the Discipline of the Sacraments.

Today, an increasing number of pilgrims make their way to the minor basilica not only during the feast day of Saint Anne but also throughout the year. The Penang state government has also made the minor basilica an official tourist spot for the state. As such, people from different nationalities visit as tourists or pilgrims. All in all, the Minor Basilica of St. Anne has become an integral part of the town of Bukit Mertajam.

Feast
Generally, Catholics celebrate the feast day of its saints on one day, for example, St Patrick's Day. The actual feast day  of St Anne is on 26 July, but it is celebrated for ten days at Bukit Mertajam, either on the actual day or immediately after the actual day. Celebrations include a 45-minute long candlelight procession, a nine-day novena and adoration of the Blessed Sacrament. Pilgrims, estimated to be around 100,000, come from Malaysia, neighbouring countries and further afield.

Mass Times
Daily Masses  
7:00am English (Tuesday-Saturday)

Sunset Masses 
06:00pm English

Sunday Masses 
08:00am English
10:00am Mandarin
11:30am English (St. Anne's Shrine)-1st Sunday of the month
11:30am Tamil 2nd to 4th or 5th Sunday of the month

See also

 Diocese Of Penang
 Roman Catholicism in Malaysia

References

External links
 St Anne's Sanctuary Bukit Mertajam
 Minor Basilica of St. Anne Official Site
 St Anne's Stations of the Cross
 Diocese Of Penang Official Site

Catholic pilgrimage sites
Religious organizations established in 1846
Roman Catholic churches completed in 1888
19th-century Roman Catholic church buildings in Malaysia
1846 establishments in the Straits Settlements
Roman Catholic churches in Penang
Basilica churches in Asia